Hong Kong Godfather may refer to:
 Hong Kong Godfather (1991 film), a Hong Kong action film
 Hong Kong Godfather (1985 film), a Hong Kong action film